Daniel Burke may refer to:

Daniel J. Burke (born 1951), former Democratic member of the Illinois House of Representatives
Dan Burke (baseball) (1868–1933), Major League Baseball player
Daniel Burke (Australian politician) (1827–1927), member of the Tasmanian House of Assembly
Daniel Burke (executive) (1929–2011), president of the American Broadcasting Corporation
Daniel Burke (rower) (born 1974), Australian rower
Daniel W. Burke (1841–1911), American soldier and Medal of Honor recipient
Daniel Burke (music promoter), Canadian journalist and music promoter.